The Khor Fakkan Amphitheatre is an amphitheatre and a cultural landmark in the Emirate of Sharjah, located in Khor Fakkan.

History 
The amphitheatre was opened to the public and inaugurated by the ruler of Sharjah Sheikh Sultan bin Muhammad Al Qasimi on 14 December 2020. In 21 April 2022, the amphitheatre was added to the United Arab Emirates banknotes and was featured on the 10 dirham bill.

Location
The amphitheatre is located at the foot of "Al Sayed" mountain facing the beach of the city of Khorfakkan.

Dimensions
The amphitheatre was built on a total area of 190,000 square feet. It can accommodate 3600 individuals, and includes a cooling system. The semicircular structure has a stone facade includes 234 arches and 295 columns and is situated on an elevated hillock. The lobby is equipped with six main elevators, divided into two entrances with three elevators for each entrance. There is a waterfall built next to it, which is 45 meters long and 11 meters wide, and is located at a height of 43 meters above sea level.

Reference

WebSite
https://khorfakkanamphitheatre.ae/

External links

Geography of the Emirate of Sharjah
Tourist attractions in the Emirate of Sharjah